The following lists events that happened during 1977 in Singapore.

Incumbents
President: Benjamin Henry Sheares
Prime Minister: Lee Kuan Yew

Events

February
 27 February – The Upper Peirce Reservoir is officially opened as Singapore's fourth reservoir. On the same day, a 10-year plan to clean up the Singapore River is announced by the late Lee Kuan Yew.

May
 28 May – Singapore defeats Penang by 3–2 during the 1977 Malaysia Cup match at Stadium Merdeka, Kuala Lumpur.

June
 13 June – The first double-decker bus is launched on service 86 by Singapore Bus Service (now SBS Transit).

July
 23 July – Big Splash opens in East Coast Park as a waterpark.
 31 July – Senoko Power Station is officially opened as Singapore's fifth power station.

December
 10 December – The Science Centre Singapore (then Singapore Science Centre) is officially opened.
 12 December – The Singapore Labour Foundation is formed to ensure families in unions are well-taken care of, as well as to promote union groups in Singapore.

Date unknown
– The World Trade Centre is completed.

Births
 17 April – 
Jaime Teo, artiste and singer, co-founder of Twelve Cupcakes.
Jamie Yeo, artiste and radio DJ.
 22 April – Michelle Chong, producer and director.
 18 July – Alfian Sa'at, playwright.
 28 November – Qi Yuwu, actor.

Deaths
 4 July – Michael Olcomendy, first Catholic Archbishop of Singapore (b. 1901).

References

 
Years in Singapore